SOAP with Attachments (SwA) or MIME for Web Services is the use of web services to send and receive files with a combination of SOAP and MIME, primarily over HTTP.

Note that SwA is not a new specification, but rather a mechanism for using the existing SOAP and MIME facilities to perfect the transmission of files using Web Services invocations.

Status

SwA is a W3C Note.  It was submitted as a proposal, but it was not adopted by the W3C. Instead, MTOM is the W3C Recommendation for handling binary data in SOAP messages. With the release of SOAP 1.2 additionally the note SOAP 1.2 Attachment Feature was published.

See also
 DIME
 MTOM
 SOAP with Attachments API for Java

References

External links
 Note by the World Wide Web Consortium on 11 December 2000

World Wide Web Consortium standards
Web service specifications
XML-based standards